Camila Solórzano Ayusa (born August 16, 1989, in San Miguel de Tucumán) is an Argentine beauty pageant titleholder who was crowned Miss Argentina 2012 and was represented her country at the Miss Universe 2012 pageant.

Miss Earth 2008
Camila represented her country at the Miss Earth 2008 pageant in the Philippines.

Miss Argentina 2012
Camila Solorzano, from Tucumán, was crowned Miss Universo Argentina 2012 during an event held on November 6. Camila, who is 23 years of age, She stands 179 cm tall and travelled to Las Vegas, Nevada, USA in December for the 2012 Miss Universe competition.

Miss Universe 2012
She represented Argentina in Miss Universe 2012 held in Las Vegas but did not place in the semifinals.

References

External links
 Miss Universe Argentina official website

Living people
Argentine beauty pageant winners
Miss Universe 2012 contestants
Miss Earth 2008 contestants
People from San Miguel de Tucumán
1989 births